Royal Air Force Elsham Wolds or more simply RAF Elsham Wolds is a former Royal Air Force station in England, which operated in the First World War and the Second World War. It is located just to the north east of the village of Elsham in north Lincolnshire.

First World War

An airfield was established at Elsham as early as December 1916 and used by C Flight of No. 33 Squadron of the Royal Flying Corps, initially operating F.E.2 and later Avro 504 and Bristol F.2 Fighter biplanes.  From June 1918 to June 1919 it was also the squadron's headquarters, taking over from Gainsborough.

The site was the most northerly of three airfields, along with RAF Kirton in Lindsey (B Flight) and RAF Scampton (A Flight), equally spaced between the cities of Hull and Lincoln for countering Zeppelin night raids. C Flight also acted as observers for the artillery batteries located at Spurn Head and Kilnsea.

The flight stayed at Elsham until June 1918, the wooden huts and a small aircraft shed that had been erected were demolished by 1919 when the station was abandoned back to agriculture at the end of the First World War.

Second World War

In the late 1930s with a new war on the horizon, extra airfields were again needed to accommodate an expansion of the RAF.  Former First World War stations were surveyed for suitability, and an area just to the west of the original Elsham site was deemed to be better suited.

Work began in the winter of 1939–1940, and the station opened with the arrival in July 1941 of 103 Squadron. Three hangars (two T-2's and one J-Type) and 27 aircraft hardstands (later increased to 36) were built. Three more T-2 hangars were built in 1944. Accommodation for around 2,500 personnel was dispersed in the nearby farmland.

No. 103 is credited with more operational sorties than any other No. 1 Group RAF squadron, and consequently suffered the group's highest losses. Of the 248 bombers lost on operations flying from Elsham Wolds, 198 were from No. 103 Squadron. By type, losses were 28 Vickers Wellingtons, 12 Halifaxes and 208 Lancasters. One Elsham Wolds Lancaster, Lancaster III ED888 M2 (Mike Squared) which served with both Nos. 103 and 576, held the Bomber Command record for operational sorties, having completed 140 between May 1943 and December 1944. A total of 974 operational hours.

Australian Don Charlwood was a navigator operating out of Elsham Wolds. In his highly regarded memoir, "No Moon Tonight", he writes movingly about his many comrades who died, those that did not (a much smaller number), and about the feelings of aircrews facing such high loss rates. Describing his arrival at Elsham Wolds with a group of 20 other young men, he wrote: ". . . of our twenty only eight were destined to depart . . . a few months later."

Post war

RAF Elsham Wolds closed in 1947 and shortly afterwards DP's (Displaced Persons), Poles and Ukrainians were temporarily housed in the buildings whilst working at the Scunthorpe Steelworks. Some contemplated transit to the US or Canada, others to set roots, mostly in Scunthorpe.
Colloquially, it started to be known as "Warsaw Hamlet" and the Post Office delivered letters using that address. By the late 1952 early '53 the DP's had moved on and once again the site reverted to first agriculture use and later as the site of an industrial estate.  The history of the site is reflected in the road names on the estate which include Halifax Approach and Wellington Way.  In the 1970s the site was bisected by the A15 road that was built to link the M180 motorway to the Humber Bridge.  The control tower lasted into the 1980s and was used as a house for a time,  which was said to be haunted. The J-Type hangar is still standing.

Current use
A large radio and telephone mast has been placed on top of Elsham hill.

 The tower is at the west end of the main runway and was during the 60s was used to relay radar from RAF Station Patrington and RAF Station Staxton Wold to RAF Lindholme near Doncaster

A memorial garden is located in the southwestern part of the old aerodrome site.

Squadrons

References

Citations

Bibliography

External links
The Wartime Memories Project
History of 103 Squadron RAF 1917 - 1975
History of Elsham Wolds Airfield WW1 and WW2

Royal Air Force stations in Lincolnshire
Royal Air Force stations of World War II in the United Kingdom
Reportedly haunted locations in East Midlands
Royal Flying Corps airfields